Churchill River may refer to:

Churchill River (Hudson Bay), which runs through Saskatchewan and Manitoba and drains into Hudson Bay
Little Churchill River, in Manitoba and a tributary of the Churchill River
Churchill River (Atlantic), which drains the Smallwood Reservoir in Labrador into the Atlantic Ocean via Lake Melville
Churchill River (electoral district), in Saskatchewan, Canada

See also